A. R. Rahman made his debut in Indian Music Industry with the 1992 Tamil film Roja. In his three decade long career, he has composed and produced original scores and songs for more than 145 films in various languages, namely Tamil, Hindi, Telugu, Malayalam, English, Persian and Mandarin.

Original scores

1990s

2000s

2010s

2020s

Soundtracks

Notes:
 The films are listed in order that the music released, regardless of the dates the film released.
 The year next to the title of the affected films indicates the release year of the either dubbed or remade version in the named language later than the original version.
 ♦ Indicates a film remade in another language with a different cast, featuring music reused from Rahman's compositions for the original.
 ! indicates only the songs are composed by Rahman, while the background score is composed by another composer.
 indicates original language release. Indicates simultaneous makes, if featuring in more languages.
 indicates a remade version, the remaining ones being dubbed versions.
 The films Nayak: The Real Hero (2001, Hindi), Saathiya (2002, Hindi), and Ok Jaanu (2017, Hindi) were remakes of the films Mudhalvan (1999, Tamil), Alaipayuthey (2000, Tamil), and O Kadhal Kanmani (2015, Tamil) respectively. The soundtracks were reused with changes and additional songs.
 The films Yuva (2004, Hindi), Raavan (2010, Hindi)  and Ye Maaya Chesave (2010, Telugu) were simultaneous makes of the films Aaytha Ezhuthu (2004, Tamil), Raavanan (2010, Tamil) and Vinnaithaandi Varuvaaya (2010, Tamil), respectively. The soundtracks were reused with changes and additional vocals.
 He has contributed one song: "Piya Haji Ali" to Fiza (1999, Hindi).
 He has also contributed for a promotional song with Tamil lyrics in the movie Lavender (Malayalam).
 He made a guest appearance as himself in the film Kadhal Virus (2002, Tamil).
 He made a guest appearance as himself in the film Bigil (2019, Tamil).

Reused tracks 

The following films had soundtracks reused from previous Rahman soundtracks:
 Pavithra (1994, Tamil) from Yoddha (1992, Malayalam) (1 song "Maampoove" used as "Sevvanam Chinnappen")
 Gangmaster (1994, Telugu) from Uzhavan (1993, Tamil) (1 song "Raa Kozhi Randum" used as "Aa Siggu Eggulenthavaraku")
 Rangeela (1995, Hindi) from Super Police (1994, Telugu) (1 song "Baabu Love Cheyyara" used as "Yaaro Sun Lo Zara")
 Anthimanthaarai (1997, Tamil) from Karuththamma (1994, Tamil) (1 song "Pacha Kili Padum" used as "Pullai Thinnum")
 Vishwa Vidhaata (1997, Hindi) from Pudhiya Mugam (1993, Tamil) excluding the track "Humdum Pyaara Pyaara" sung by Udit Narayan, Kavita Krishnamurthy.
 Kabhi Na Kabhi (1998, Hindi) from Duet (1994, Tamil) 1 song (Anjali), with changes into (Mil Gayee Mil Gayee)
 Vande Mataram (1998, Hindi) reused "Porale Ponnuthayi" from Karuththamma (1994, Tamil) as Chanda Suraj and "Ottagathai Kattikko" from Gentleman (1993, Tamil) as Musafir, both with completely different vocals and instrumentation
 Thakshak (1999, Hindi) from En Swasa Kaatre (1999, Tamil) 1 song (Jumbalaka), with changes in vocals and instrumentation
 Pukar (1999, Hindi) from En Swasa Kaatre (1999, Tamil) 1 song ('Kay Sera Sera' from 'Nayagara'), with changes in vocals and instrumentation. Rahman reused his single Oh Bosnia in this movie with changes in lyrics which is Ek tuhi Barosa which was sung by Lata Mangeskar.
 Jodi (1999, Tamil) and Sajni (2007, Kannada) from Doli Saja Ke Rakhna (1999, Hindi), with 3 new songs added
 Star (2001, Tamil) from Thakshak (1999), Hindi – 3 songs ('Boondin Se Baaten' reused as 'Manasukkul' | 'Dheem Tara Dare' reused as 'Thom Karuvil Irun Thom' | 'Range De' reused as 'Rasika' ) and 1947/Earth (1998, Hindi) – 1 song ('Rut Aa Gayi Re' reused as 'Macha Machiniye'), with 1 new song added
 Love You Hamesha (2001, Hindi) from May Madham (1994, Tamil)
 Alli Arjuna (2001,Tamil ) reused from One 2 Ka 4 (2001, Hindi ) 2 songs ("Sona Nahi" reused as "Enthan Nenjil") & ("Osakka Muraiya" reused as "Osakka "),  from Pukar (1999, Hindi) 1 song (Sunta Hai Mera Khuda) and Earth(1998, Hindi) 1 song (Banno Rani).
 Lakeer – Forbidden Lines (2004, Hindi) from Rhythm (2000, Tamil – 3 songs), with 3 new songs added
 Swades (2004, Hindi) from Baba (2002, Tamil) (1 song "Baba Kichchu Tha" used as "Dekho Na"  with different vocals and instrumentation)
 Sakkarakatti (2008, Tamil) : Reused 2 tracks from Meenaxi (2004, Hindi) – "Chinnamma" from 'Chinnamma Chilakkamma', and "Naan Epoudhu" from 'Yeh Rishta'
 Slumdog Millionaire (2009, English): "Liquid Dance" was previously used as a background track in Azhagiya Thamizh Magan (2007, Tamil) with different instrumentation and no vocals, "Gangsta blues" was used as "Dochey" in Komaram Puli with different vocals and certain changes.
 SuperHeavy (2011, English): The instrumental composition of the song Jiya Se Jiya (sung by A. R. Rahman, Karthik, Raqueeb Aalam) from his own album Connections (2009) was reused as a song named Mahiya that had slight changes in instrumentation, featuring vocals by himself, Joss Stone, Mick Jagger, Damian 'Jr. Gong' Marley and was included as a bonus track in the deluxe edition of the album SuperHeavy (2011).
 Ekk Deewana Tha (2012, Hindi): All compositions from Vinnaithaandi Varuvaayaa (2009, Tamil) were re-used with additional tracks— instrumental song "Moments In Kerala", extended versions of songs "Jessy's Land", "Jessie's Driving Me Crazy" and change in instrumentation of "Kannukkul Kannai" as "Dost Hai".
 Godfather (2012, Kannada) from Varalaru (2006, Tamil), with 1 new track added
 Million Dollar Arm (2014, English): "Unborn Children" song was used as a re-recording piece of "Thirakatha" from En Swasa Kaatre (1999, Tamil)
 Aaraattu (2021, Malayalam) from Kadhalan (1994, Tamil) (1 song "Mukkala Muqabla" recreated with different vocals and instrumentation)

Tracks used in Hollywood Movies or Series 

The following soundtracks of A.R. Rahman were used in Hollywood movies or Series by Hollywood Musicians  :
"The Bombay Theme" from Bombay - The Theme was used in Lord of War (2005,English) Movie.
"Chaiyya Chaiyya" from Dil Se - The Song was used in Inside Man (2006,English) Movie.
"Rang De" from Thakshak - The Song was used in The Accidental Husband (2008,English) Movie.
"Swasame" from Thenali - The Song was used in The Accidental Husband (2008,English) Movie.
"Yaro Yarodi" from Alaipayuthey - The Song was used in The Accidental Husband (2008,English) Movie.
"Urvasi" from Kadhalan - The Song was used in Lion (2016,English) Movie.
"Oh Nanba" from Lingaa - Small Track of the Song was used In Episode 1 Title Card of Ms. Marvel (2022,English) Series.
"Tere Bina" from Guru - The Remix (Khanvict Remix) Version of the song was used in episode 3  of Ms. Marvel (2022,English) Series.

Discography as playback singer 

Note
In the language column,  "/" is used for dubbed in other languages. 
", " shows that the original song have contain many languages.

Discography as lyricist

Albums

Singles

Featured singles

Writer

Music videos

Special films

Theatre 
 Bombay Dreams (2002)
 Lord of the Rings (2006)
 One Heart (2017)
 Why? The musical (2022)

Concert recordings

Concert tours 
 A. R. Rahman Jai Ho Concert: The Journey Home World Tour
 A. R. Rahman Encore: Most awaited tour of the year
A.R. Rahman Concert In FAIRFAX, Virginia, (1 September 2018 
A.R. Rahman Connect In Doha, Qatar (27 March 2019)
A.R. Rahman Connect In Chennai (11 August 2019)
A.R. Rahman Concert In New York City(14 September 2019)
 A.R. Rahman Connect In Dubai,  (15 November 2019)

DVDs 
 A.R. Rahman Hits Vol 1 – A.R. Rahman Hits Vol 6. Ayngaran International
 Top 50 of A. R. Rahman. Pyramid
 Super Hits of A.R. Rahman (2008)
 A.R.Rahman live in Concert (California 2000)

Compilations / additional soundtracks 
 The Accidental Husband (2008). Tracks: "Yaro Yarodi", "Swasamae", "Rang De"
 Anokha – Soundz of the Asian Underground (1997). Polygram. Track: "Bombay Theme" 1
 A. R. Rahman – A World of Music (2009). Sony BMG. 59 Tracks
 A. R. Rahman Connections – A Journey Through Anthems (2009). Universal.
 The Best of the Musicals. Solid Gold. Track: "Shakalaka Baby"
 Ambient Chillout Mix Volume 1 (2002). Track: "Bombay Theme"
 Essential Guide to India (2006). Union Square Music. Track: "Bombay Theme"
 Essential Guide to World Music (2006). Union Square Music. Track: "Mazhai Thuli"
 Café del Mar Volume 5 (1998). MCA. Track: "Bombay Theme"
 Chakra Seven Centers (Instrumental) (1995). Meta Records. Track:"Ajna Chakra" (Bombay Theme)
 Chilled Symphonies. Meta Records. Track: "Bombay Theme"
 Denti Mercury. Track: "Bombay Theme"
 Divine Intervention. Milan Music. Track: "Bombay Theme"
 Flying Carpet. Wagram Records. Track: "Bombay Theme"
 Incredible India. Universal Records. Track: "Bombay Theme"
 Indian Summer. C4. Track: "Bombay Theme"
 Eastern Drums and Breaks Volume 2. Track: "So Gaye Hain"
 India The Women's Voice. Union Square Music. Tracks: "Kehna Hi Kya", "Yaro Yarodi"
 In the Heart of the World (2007). Track: "Shakalaka Baby"
 Inside Man (2006). Varèse Sarabande. Track: Chaiyya Chaiyya
 Introducing A. R. Rahman (2006). Union Square Music. 20 Tracks
 Lord of War (2005). Lakeshore Records. Track: "Bombay Theme"
 Mondo India. Ark 21. Tracks: "Varaaghai Nadhi", "Sowkiyamma", "Narumugaiyye", "Mazhai Thuli"
 MTV Total Mix. Ark 21. Track: "Musafir"(Vande Mataram)
 Paradisiac 2. Track: "Bombay Theme"
 Patchwork. Naive. Track: "Bombay Theme"
 Pilotes Automatique – La Caution's Peines De Maures / Arc-en-ciel Pour Daltoniens (2005). Kerozen Music, Wagram. Track: "Ottagathai Kattiko remix)"
 Princess Mononoke. Track: "Bombay Theme"(used in trailers)
 Sa trincha Volume 2. Universal International. Track: "Bombay Theme"
 The Streets of Bollywood and Beyond (2006). Times Square Records. Track: "Narthirthinna"
 Varka Mix. Track: "Bombay Theme"
 Vedic Path. Palm World Voices. Track: "Bombay Theme"
 VIP Lounge 1. Wagram Records. Track: "Gurus of Peace"(Vande Mataram)
 Zen 3. Track: "Bombay Theme"
1 "Bombay Theme" is alternatively credited as "Bombay Theme Tune," "Mumbai Theme Tune" or "Bombay Theme Music" in compilations

Ad jingles 
 Airtel Express Yourself & Love
 Airtel Live Every Moment
 Airtel Street Dance (2010)
 Sheenlac Paints 
 Allwyn Trendy Watches
 Asian Paints
 Bombay Dyeing
 Boost - Chocolate drink
 Cinthol
 Craze Biscuit
 Garden Sarees
 Genic Chocolates
 Hero Punch
 Hero MotoCorp
 JBL (2012)
 Lebara Mobile (2010)
 Leo Coffee
 Medimix Soap
 MGM Dizzee World
 MRF Tyres - With Sameer Nair
 Murugan Textiles
 Nutrine Aasai chocolate
 Parry's Kasthuri Tea
 Premier Pressure Cooker
 Prince Jewellery
 Regaul - First advertisement
 Remanika Sarees
 Springz Mineral Water
 Tata Chola Tea
 Titan Industries
 Toyota Etios (2010)
 Triffany Chocolates
 TTK Industries - Vests and briefs ad; jingles were used in "Thee Thee" song from Thiruda Thiruda
 Wall's Magnum Ice Cream
 Young World
 Renault India
 Sulthan Diamonds & Gold
 Dil Jhoome With Mazza
Horlicks - Fearless Song
Apollo Tyres, Ganga- The River Of People

Ringtones 
Rahman released five original ringtones in 2002 exclusive to Airtel customers. Later, he released another ringtone "Disabled Film" for the same brand. In 2010, he composed a ringtone for Lebara Mobile.
 Buddy (2002)
 Desire (2002)
 Dream (2002)
 Little One (2002)
 Sizzle (2002)
 Disabled Film (2004)
 Lebara Bird Call (2010)

Signature tunes 
 Bharti Airtel: Signature tune for Bharti Airtel became the world's most downloaded mobile music with over 150 million downloads. A new version was released in 2010.
 Asianet: Signature song for Malayalam channel Asianet, titled "Shyama Sundara Kera Kedara Bhoomi"; performed by Sujatha and Kalyani Menon; Released 1994
 Champions League Twenty20: Official anthem for the Champions League Twenty20; Released 2008
 Chirakukal: Theme music for a weekly children's television series on Asianet in the mid-1990s
 Commonwealth Games 2010: Official anthem for the 2010 Commonwealth Games, titled "Jiyo Utho Bado Jeeto"; performed by Rahman; Released 28 August 2010
 Hyderabad International Airport: Theme song for Hyderabad International Airport, titled "Aasman"; performed by Benny Dayal and chorus; Released 2008
 JJTV: Signature song for Tamil channel JJTV
 Josh FM: signature song for josh fm radio; Released 2012
 17th Jio MAMI Mumbai Film Festival: Rahman's tune would be used in a special promo film that will be played during the festival, which will be held from 29 October 2015 to 5 November 2015. The tune was first featured in the festival's campaign film. The entire tune, however, will be played at the opening ceremony.
 National Games:
 News 7: A Tamil News television channel to attract youth and teenagers; Released October 2014
 NDTV India: Theme song for Indian news channel NDTV; Released 2003
 Radio DesiBeat: Signature tune for Radio Desi Beats; Released 20 November 2010
 South Asian Games 1995: Official anthem for the 1995 SAF Games held in Chennai
 Spirit of Unity: Theme song for the Madras Telugu Academy's concerts
 Sun TV: Pongal theme of Tamil channel Sun TV
 Toyota Etios: Theme song for Toyota Etios, titled "Pehli Baar"; performed by Chinmayi, Javed Ali, Madhushree; Released 1 December 2010
 Unity of Light: Theme song for live musical show, Unity of Light, aired on Vijay TV 18 and 25 May 2003
 World Classical Tamil Conference 2010: Anthem for the meet, "Semmozhiyaana Thamizh Mozhiyaam" penned by M. Karunanidhi and performed by leading artists
 WorldSpace: Theme song for WorldSpace radio; Released 2006
 Starplus: Rishta Wahi, Baat Nayi, The brand signature tune has been composed by A.R. Rahman

Instrumental adaptation 
 Roja (1992)
 Gentleman (1993)
 May Madham (1994)

Television 
 Everest (telenovela) (2014)
 Syamasundara Asianet theme song (1994)
 Sa Re Ga Ma Pa Challenge 2009 (2009)
 The Kapil Sharma Show (2016)
 Sa Re Ga Ma Pa L'il Champs 2017 (2017)
 The Voice (Indian TV series) as Super Guru 
 Vijay TV Super Singer Season 6

Album sales

References 
General

 "A. R. Rahman discography". Official website

 "50 Greatest Songs of A.R. Rahman". Fan Listing

Specific

External links 
 
 

Discography
Discographies of Indian artists